Mark Humphrey (born 1970) is an English interior designer and installation artist.

Life
Mark Humphrey was born in 1970 in Wiltshire and grew up in Berkshire. In 1988, he studied fine art at Maidenhead Art College and in 1989 he moved to London, studying a BA in interior architecture at Middlesex University from 1989 to 1993. He was awarded the Mipim Award in 2004.

Since the mid 1990s, Humphrey has produced multidisciplinary works – including editions, licences, and studies – in architecture, graphics, installations, objects, paintings, rooms, and sculptures. He develops the relationships between ideas, materials, finishes, making, and audience interaction. His catalogue spans the entire creative operation, from sketches through to physical objects and spaces. His mixed media studies – collages, drawings, maquettes, montages, paintings, reliefs, sculptures, sketchbooks, and sketches – define his work style.

Works

2016–2017

Boots On The Ground, commissioned by Canary Wharf Group, 2016

2014–2015
Forever, donated by Mark Humphrey Ltd to Royal Wootton Bassett and the British Armed Forces, Wiltshire, 2015
Philanthropy Creator solo show, Jumeirah, Mayfair, 2015
Every One Remembered, commissioned by The Royal British Legion, Cardiff, NEC Birmingham, 2014
Every One Remembered, commissioned by The Royal British Legion, Trafalgar Square, London, 2014
Poppy Appeal Sculptures, endorsed by The Royal British Legion, UK shopping centres, 2014
Centenary Artist solo show, Jumeirah, Mayfair, 2014
Modern Antiquities solo show, Jumeirah, Mayfair, 2014

2012–2013
Poppy Appeal Sculptures, endorsed by The Royal British Legion, at Royal Armouries Leeds, 2013
Poppy Appeal Sculptures, endorsed by The Royal British Legion, at Land Securities London, 2013
Skin on Skin, Stone on Stone solo show, Jumeirah, Mayfair, 2013
Final Encore, St James Theatre, London, in consultation with Westminster City Council, 2012
Ice Circles, Jumeirah Living, London, 2012
Seed of Creativity Award, KLC School of Design, 2012
Diamonds and Flames solo show, Jumeirah, Mayfair, 2012
Bathing Sculpture solo show, Design Centre, London, 2012
Art in Life solo show, Osborne Samuel gallery, Mayfair, 2012

2010–2011
Curved Tables, Kenzo, 2011 onwards
Shizaru group show, Shizaru gallery, Mayfair, 2011

2007–2009
Jalouse, Mayfair, 2008
Interior Jewel Sculptures solo show, Italian Institute of Culture, Belgravia, 2008

2001–2003
Grosvenor Place, Repulse Bay, Hong Kong, 2003 – a show suite for a new apartment block
King and Queen Chairs, Fendi, 2001 onwards
Iguana, The Rug Company, 2000 onwards
Water Droplets, Waterfront Bathrooms, 2000 onwards

References

External links
Mark Humphrey Ltd website
The Royal British Legion website

English industrial designers
English interior designers
English furniture designers
English installation artists
1970 births
Living people